High-performance addressing (HPA) is an LCD passive-matrix display technology commonly found on low-end portable computers; versions of HPA have been developed by Hitachi and by Sharp. HPA enables higher response rates and contrast, displaying up to 16-million colors; however, HPA displays lack the crispness that is found with an Active-matrix display.
HPA uses a technique called multiline addressing in which the incoming video signal is analyzed and the image is refreshed with a frequency as high as possible.

References

Display technology